MoIn the Republic of Ireland, a commission of investigation is a statutory commission established under the Commissions of Investigation Act 2004 to investigate a matter of "urgent public concern". A commission of investigation is a less expensive but less powerful alternative to a tribunal of inquiry. Commissions of investigation may take evidence in private, whereas tribunals of inquiry are held in public. In 2017, the Fine Gael-led government planned to have Peter Charleton chair a commission into the Garda whistleblower scandal; opposition demands led it to change this to a tribunal.

The Commission to Inquire into Child Abuse had been established in 2000 by a specific Act of the Oireachtas, with further acts passed subsequently to amend its operation. The Commissions of Investigation Act 2004 was intended to provide a template so that further commissions could be established more simply, by statutory instrument after a resolution by the houses of the Oireachtas.

See also
 Royal commission, similar body in Commonwealth countries

References